Endrick River is a perennial river of the Shoalhaven catchment located in the Southern Tablelands region of New South Wales, Australia.

Location and features
Endrick River rises below Quiltys Mountain on the western slopes of the Budawang Range near Sassafras, and flows generally south southwest, west, northwest, and then north by west, joined by six minor tributaries, before reaching its confluence with the Shoalhaven River near Nerriga, descending  over its  course.

See also

Budawang National Park

List of rivers of New South Wales (A–K)
Morton National Park
Rivers of New South Wales

References

Rivers of New South Wales
Southern Tablelands
City of Shoalhaven